Arturo Ferrer (born July 11, 1959) is a Mexican sprint canoer who competed in the mid-1980s. At the 1984 Summer Olympics in Los Angeles, he finished eighth in the C-2 1000 m event while being eliminated in the semifinals of the C-2 500 m event.

References
Sports-Reference.com profile

1959 births
Canoeists at the 1984 Summer Olympics
Living people
Mexican male canoeists
Olympic canoeists of Mexico
20th-century Mexican people